The Urban Transport Group (UTG) is a British transport organisation created in 2016, replacing the former Passenger Transport Executive Group (PTEG).

It has seven full members, the six Passenger transport executives and Transport for London and three associate members: Strathclyde Partnership for Transport, Bristol and the West of England Authorities, and Nottingham City Council. Transport for Greater Manchester's Chief Executive Dr Jon Lamonte is chair of the organisation.

Its main roles are:

making the case for urban transport; 
acting as a professional network for public sector urban transport professionals; 
providing leadership by addressing longer-term challenges.

It has widened its focus, compared to the role of the Passenger Transport Executive Group to include strategic highways, active travel, and freight and logistics.

Urban transport is now said to be a key element of the devolution agenda, according to  Mike Brown, London’s transport commissioner.

References

Transport organisations based in the United Kingdom
Professional associations based in the United Kingdom